Frane Vojković (born 20 December 1996) is a Croatian footballer who most recently played as an attacking midfielder for NK Lokomotiva Zagreb.

Club career

Early years 
Vojković joined the HNK Hajduk Split academy at the age of 6, and advanced through the ranks, playing for the national team in all the categories from U14 upwards. A precocious player, he made his U17 national team debut at the age of 15, becoming a first-team regular there, while, despite being born in the last days of 1996, he played for the '95 generation, helping it the national U17 championship. However, his career was brought to a halt by a string of serious injuries, making him miss every match between November 2013 and February 2015. Returning to football in early 2015, he played another two matches for the Croatia U19 team and two further matches for the third-tier reserves of Hajduk, before yet another injury in March 2015.

HNK Hajduk Split

2016–17 season 
He returned to training in the winter of 2015/16, still impressing enough to receive a 3.5-year long professional contract, despite effectively being forced out of the game for more than two years. He made his first-team debut in the 27.2.2016 1-0 away loss against HNK Rijeka, coming it at half-time for Toma Bašić

HNK Cibalia Vinkovci

2017–18 season 
In September 2017, Vojković was loaned to HNK Cibalia after being given little chance at Hajduk Split. During his time at Cibalia he had just few appearances mostly because of injuries.

NK Rudeš

2018–19 season 
In July 2018, Vojković was once again loaned to Prva HNL club NK Rudeš along with Anthony Kalik.

International career 
Frane has represented Croatia in all categories from U14 upwards. He made his U17 national team debut at the age of 15, becoming a first-team regular there, while, despite being born in the last days of 1996, he played for the '95 generation, helping it the national U17 championship.

Career statistics

Club 
As of 14 August 2018

International 
As of 13 November 2017

Personal life 
Frane is one of three sons born to Ivan and Sanda Vojkovic. Frane has an older brother, Mirko, who is one year older and younger brother Josip who was born in 1998.

Vojkovic wears number 88 on the back of his playing jersey in honour of his grandfather Simun Vojkovic who died at the age of 88

References

External links
 
Frane Vojković at hajduk.hr

1996 births
Living people
Footballers from Split, Croatia
Association football midfielders
Croatian footballers
Croatia under-21 international footballers
Croatia youth international footballers
NK Dugopolje players
HNK Hajduk Split players
HNK Hajduk Split II players
HNK Cibalia players
NK Rudeš players
FC Karpaty Lviv players
NK Lokomotiva Zagreb players
Croatian Football League players
First Football League (Croatia) players
Ukrainian Premier League players
Croatian expatriate footballers
Expatriate footballers in Ukraine
Croatian expatriate sportspeople in Ukraine